Jasse Tuominen (born 12 November 1995) is a Finnish professional footballer who plays for Veikkausliiga club KuPS as a striker.

Club career
Born in Kuopio, Tuominen has played for Lahti, Lahti Akatemia and MP. He signed for Belarusian club BATE Borisov in March 2017.

In December 2019 he signed for Swedish club Häcken for the 2020 season.

International career
He made his international debut for Finland in 2017.

International goals
Scores and results list Finland's goal tally first.

References

1995 births
Living people
Finnish footballers
Finland international footballers
Association football forwards
Finnish expatriate footballers
FC Lahti players
FC Kuusysi players
Mikkelin Palloilijat players
FC BATE Borisov players
BK Häcken players
Kakkonen players
Ykkönen players
Veikkausliiga players
Belarusian Premier League players
Finnish expatriate sportspeople in Belarus
Finnish expatriate sportspeople in Sweden
Expatriate footballers in Belarus
Expatriate footballers in Sweden
Tromsø IL players
Finnish expatriate sportspeople in Norway
Expatriate footballers in Norway
People from Kuopio
Sportspeople from North Savo
Kuopion Palloseura players